Arthur M. Shapiro (born January 6, 1946) is a professor of evolution and ecology at the University of California, Davis.  He graduated with an AB in biology from University of Pennsylvania and completed his PhD in Entomology at Cornell in 1970.

References

External links
 DATELINE article about Arthur Shapiro
 CBS local news
 The Butterfly Man
 Science Daily

1946 births
American ecologists
Living people
University of California, Davis faculty
University of Pennsylvania alumni
Cornell University College of Agriculture and Life Sciences alumni